Anolis mariarum, the blemished anole, is a species of lizard in the family Dactyloidae. The species is found in Colombia.

References

Anoles
Endemic fauna of Colombia
Reptiles of Colombia
Reptiles described in 1932
Taxa named by Thomas Barbour